The Finch Society of Australia Inc. is an established organisation designed as a forum to connect "finch fanciers". The society is a part of the animal fancy movement, supporting and promoting animal welfare.

The Finch Society of Australia is more than 50 years old and has a number of branches and affiliate clubs, namely,
 Wollongong Finch Club
 Hawkesbury Finch Club
 Hunter Valley Finch Club
 Canberra Finch Club
Although these branches are situated in New South Wales and Australian Capital Territory, the society has members from all states of Australia.

Publications
The Finch Society of Australia produces a publication called The Finch Breeders Review that is distributed to all members bi-monthly. The society produces an advertisement named 'Bird Trader' to assist members of the society in trading and selling their birds.

The Hunter club additionally produces a monthly publication called, The Finch Fancier while the Hawkesbury club similarly produces Finch Bizz.

Incumbents
 President: Sam Davis
 Secretary: Brian Read
 Treasurer: Lyn Wright
 Vice-presidents: Jason Holmes, Ivan Cindric

See also
Royal Australasian Ornithologists Union

References

External links
 Finch Society of Australia website
 National Animal Clubs & Animal Welfare Groups

Ornithological organisations in Australia
Aviculture
Finches